Kirpal may refer to:

Bhupinder Nath Kirpal (born 1937), the 31st Chief Justice of India
Irene Kirpal (1886–1977), Czechoslovakian politician
Neha Kirpal, the founder of the India Art Fair in 2008
Sanjay Kirpal, Fijian politician, Member of the Parliament of Fiji
Kirpal Nandra, British physicist, director at the Max Planck Institute for Extraterrestrial Physics

See also
Sawan Kirpal Ruhani Mission, non-profit, spiritual organization
Karpal
Kerpel